Pudhu Yugam is a 1954 Indian Tamil-language film directed by Gopu and Sundar. The film stars S. A. Natarajan, P. V. Narasimha Bharathi, Krishna Kumari and M. S. Draupadi.

Plot
Professor Raghunath is a social reformer. His younger sister Chellam is a widow. Raghunath plans to remarry her to his student Sekar. Sekar and Chellam move closely. As a result, Chellam becomes pregnant before marriage. Raghunath does not know this. He mortgages his house and help Sekar to establish a business. Sekar becomes rich and make arrangements to marry a rich girl, Chitra. Chellam pleads with Sekar but he refuses to marry her. Raghunath also talks to Sekar but Sekar is adamant in his decision. Raghunath learns of Chellam's pregnancy and kills himself due to the disgrace. The house is confiscated. Chellam leaves with Raghunath's son Vinodhan. They are looked after by Murugan and Valli who lives in the poor quarter. Chellam gives birth to a girl child and she names her as Pushpa. She leaves Pushpa with Murugan and Valli and goes away in search of a job. She gets a job as a baby-sitter to Raja, a grandson of a rich old man. She brings up both Vinodhan and Raja who grows up and become a doctor and Police Inspector respectively. Pushpa becomes a nurse. In the meantime, Sekar marries Chitra and beget a girl child, Whether Chellam takes revenge on Sekar, and what happens to the children all form the rest of the story.

Cast
Cast from the song book.

Male cast
S. A. Natarajan
Narasimha Bharathi
S. V. Subbaiah
C. S. Pandian
M. S. Muthukrishnan
Sai Ram
Bhairavan
C. V. V. Panthulu
Samikannu
Govindan
Gopal
Krishna Rao

Female cast
M. S. Draupadi
Krishnakumari
M. Saroja
Vimala
Rajamani
Rathnam

Crew
Producer: G. Ramanathan
Directors: Gopu, Sundar
Screenplay & Dialogues: Ka. Mu. Sheriff
Cinematography: M. R. Purushothaman
Editing: T. R. Gopu, G. Kalyanasundaram
Art: R. B. Subramanian
Audiography: R. G. Pillai, K. Viswanath
Choreography: Chopra, Madhavan
Production Company: Sri Sai Gaanaamrudha Pictures
Laboratory: Vijaya

Production
The film was produced by the music composer G. Ramanathan.

Soundtrack
Music was composed by G. Ramanathan while the lyrics were penned by A. Maruthakasi, Thanjai N. Ramaiah Dass and Ka. Mu. Sheriff. Playback singers are T. M. Soundararajan, S. C. Krishnan, V. T. Rajagopalan, Ghantasala, M. L. Vasanthakumari, P. Leela, A. P. Komala, Jikki, N. L. Ganasaraswathi, A. G. Rathnamala and T. S. Bhagavathi.

References

Indian drama films
Films scored by G. Ramanathan
1950s Tamil-language films